Charles Beaubrun (Charles Bobrun) (1604–1692) was a French portrait painter active in Paris between 1630 and 1670.

Life 
Charles Beaubrun was born at Amboise, a member of a distinguished family of painters. He studied under his uncle Louis Beaubrun (d. 1627). He and his cousin Henri Beaubrun (II) (1603–1677), were portrait painters in the courts of King Louis XIII and Louis XIV of France. Some of his work is jointly attributed to Henri.
His youngest brother, Michel Beaubrun (d 1642), was also a painter. Charles Beaubrun died at Paris.

Work 
Beaubrun made many portraits of the reigning French queens, painting according to the prevailing court conventions. Thus certain similarities are evident between his portrait of Maria Theresa of Spain (Maria Theresa, Infanta of Spain), queen to Louis XIV, and an earlier portrait of Anne of Austria, queen to his father Louis XIII (both shown here) even wearing the same regal gowns.

Sources 
 Terminartors: Charles Beaubrun

Sources for works 
 Scholars Resource

References 

1604 births
1692 deaths
People from Amboise
17th-century French painters
French male painters
French portrait painters